Daqiao is a town in Nanhu District, Jiaxing, Zhejiang province, China. , it has 6 residential communities and 14 villages under its administration.

See also 
 List of township-level divisions of Zhejiang

References 

Township-level divisions of Zhejiang
Jiaxing